The 2015 FIBA Americas Championship for Men, later known as the FIBA AmeriCup, was the FIBA Americas qualifying tournament for the 2016 Summer Olympics, in Brazil. This FIBA AmeriCup tournament was held in Mexico City, Mexico. The tournament was won for the first time by the Venezuelan national basketball team. Venezuela and runner-up , qualified directly for the 2016 Olympics. They joined the FIBA Americas member, who qualified for the Olympics by virtue of winning the 2014 FIBA World Cup, and they elected not to participate at this tournament; and FIBA Americas member, who finished 9th in the tournament, but qualified for the Olympics as the host nation.

The tournament had great attendance every day, breaking FIBA Americas records, and had attendances of 20,000 people, at the third place and finals games.

Qualification 

 Host country

 Central American and Caribbean Sub-Zone: (2014 Centrobasket)

 North American Sub-Zone:

 South American Sub-Zone: (2014 South American Championship)

Host selection 
On 7 August 2014 at the day of the 2014 Centrobasket final, FIBA Americas announced that Mexico was chosen as the host of the championship, over Brazil and Venezuela. The tournament was to be staged at the Monterrey Arena but on 9 May 2015, the venue was moved to the Palacio de los Deportes in Mexico City, and that the dates were also changed to 6 September to 12 September.

Venue

Draw
The draw was held in Museum of Steel, Fundidora Park, Monterrey, Nuevo Leon on 25 March. This was how the teams were seeded:

Squads

Preliminary round

Group A

All times are local (UTC−05:00).

Group B

All times are local (UTC−05:00).

Second round

All times are local (UTC−05:00).

Final round

Semifinals
Finalists qualify for the 2016 Summer Olympics, while losing semifinalists qualify to the 2016 FIBA World Olympic Qualifying Tournament for Men.

Bronze medal game

Final

Final ranking

Awards

All-Tournament Team

  Heissler Guillént
  Andrew Wiggins
  Andrés Nocioni 
  Luis Scola (MVP)
  Gustavo Ayón

References

 
FIBA AmeriCup
2015–16 in North American basketball
2015–16 in South American basketball
2015 in Mexican sports
International basketball competitions hosted by Mexico
Sports competitions in Mexico City
2010s in Mexico City
August 2015 sports events in Mexico
September 2015 sports events in Mexico